The Hi-Fi Nightingale is an album from Caterina Valente. Released in the US (1956).

This album includes her big hits "Malagueña" and "The Breeze and I".

Track listing

Side 1
 "The Breeze and I" (Andalucia)
 "If Hearts Could Talk"
 "Temptation"
 "The Ecstasy"
 "Jalousie"
 "Fiesta Cubana"

Side 2
 "Malaguena"
 "The Way You Love Me"
 "My Lonely Lover" (Chanson D'Amour)
 "Begin the Beguine"
 "Siboney"
 "This Must Be Wrong"
 "This Must Be Wrong (Oho Aha)"

Credits

 Georges Auric	Composer
 Vera Bloom	Composer
 Nacio Herb Brown	Composer
 Henri Contet	Composer
 Paul Durand	Composer
 Kurt Feltz	Composer, Producer
 Silvio Francesco	Primary Artist
 Arthur Freed	Composer
 Jacob Gade	Composer
 Heinz Gietz	Composer
 Kermit Goell	Composer
 Jimmy Kennedy	Composer
 Raymond Klages	Composer
 Ernesto Lecuona	Composer
 Dolly Morse	Composer
 Cole Porter	Composer
 Nat Simon	Composer
 Herb Steiner	Composer
 Kay Twomey	Composer
 Caterina Valente	 Primary Artist, Vocals
 Fred Wise	Composer

References

Caterina Valente compilation albums
1956 compilation albums
Decca Records compilation albums
French-language compilation albums
Spanish-language compilation albums